or  is a lake in the municipality of Hamarøy in Nordland county, Norway. The European route E06 highway runs along the eastern shore of the lake. The lake Sandnesvatnet lies to the southeast and the lake Rotvatnet lies to the north of Strindvatnet.

See also
List of lakes in Norway

References

Hamarøy
Lakes of Nordland